The 1951 Five Nations Championship was the twenty-second series of the rugby union Five Nations Championship. Including the previous incarnations as the Home Nations and Five Nations, this was the fifty-seventh series of the northern hemisphere rugby union championship. Ten matches were played between 13 January and 7 April. It was contested by England, France, Ireland, Scotland and Wales.  missed out on a second Grand Slam after drawing against  at Cardiff Arms Park, but won the championship.

Participants
The teams involved were:

Table

Results

External links

The official RBS Six Nations Site

Six Nations Championship seasons
Five Nations
Five Nations 
Five Nations
Five Nations
Five Nations
Five Nations
Five Nations
Five Nations
Five Nations
Five Nations